Bikkia is a genus of flowering plants in the family Rubiaceae. It is native to the Philippines, the Maluku region of eastern Indonesia, New Guinea and the western Pacific (Melanesia and Micronesia). The genus was named by Caspar Reinwardt in 1825. Seven of the New Caledonian species previously included in Bikkia were transferred to a separate genus, Thiollierea, in 2011 based on molecular and morphological information.

Species
 Bikkia bridgeana F.Muell. - New Guinea
 Bikkia commerconiana K.Schum. - New Guinea
 Bikkia gaudichaudiana Brongn. - New Guinea
 Bikkia guilloviana Brongn. - New Guinea
 Bikkia longicarpa Valeton - Mariana Islands
 Bikkia moluccana Suess. ex Troll & Dragend. - Maluku
 Bikkia palauensis Valeton - Palau
 Bikkia pancheri (Brongn.) Guillaumin - Bismarck Archipelago, Solomon Islands, New Caledonia, Vanuatu 
 Bikkia philippinensis Valeton - Cebu
 Bikkia tetrandra (L.f.) A.Rich. - New Guinea, Solomon Islands, Fiji, Niue, New Caledonia, Tonga, Vanuatu, Micronesia,  Wallis-Futuna Islands

References

External links
Bikkia in the World Checklist of Rubiaceae

 
Rubiaceae genera
Flora of the Visayas
Flora of the Maluku Islands
Flora of Papuasia
Flora of the Pacific
Taxonomy articles created by Polbot